Bomarea ceratophora is a species of flowering plant in the family Alstroemeriaceae. It is endemic to Ecuador, where it is known from only two collections.

References

Endemic flora of Ecuador
ceratophora
Endangered plants
Taxonomy articles created by Polbot